The Quito Metro, abbreviated as MDQ, is an underground rail mass transit system consisting of a single line that is planned to start full passenger operation in March 2023 in Quito, the capital of Ecuador.

History
Construction on the main south and north stations began in December 2012.
Construction of the metro line began in January 2016.
The metro was projected to be operational in August 2020, but has been delayed to March 2023. Official inauguration was held in 21 December 2022.

System
The system's first line, which will include 15 stations, extends from Quitumbe (which is to the south of the city) to El Labrador (which is to the north of the city). The 15 stations on this line are, from north to south: 

El Labrador
Jipijapa
Iñaquito
La Carolina
Pradera
Universidad Central
El Ejido
La Alameda
San Francisco
La Magdalena
El Recreo
Cardenal de la Torre
Solanda
Morán Valverde
Quitumbe

Only one of the stations, the one in Plaza de San Francisco (by the San Francisco monastery), will be placed in the historic center of Quito (declared a World Heritage Site by UNESCO in 1978). Due to archaeological remains found at the proposed site of the San Francisco Station in late 2016, the station will be moved two blocks further south to Plaza 24th of May, and the remains will not be disturbed further.

Every station is painted in a distinct color to help the passenger orientation.

The design of Line 1 allows for a further five stations intermediate to those initially constructed to be built if demand warrants, and for a potential 5 km extension northwards to the Ofelia bus terminal.

References

External links 

  
 Quito on UrbanRail.net